Evgeni Yotov Yordanov (born May 5, 1940) is a Bulgarian track and field athlete who competed in the 1964 Summer Olympics.

In 1964 he finished twelfth in the high jump event.

External links
 profile

1940 births
Living people
Bulgarian male high jumpers
Olympic athletes of Bulgaria
Athletes (track and field) at the 1964 Summer Olympics